Eduard Zeman (11 April 1948 – 25 June 2017) was a Czech politician. He served on the Czech National Council from 1992 to 1993, and its succeeding legislative body, the Chamber of Deputies, until 2006. From 1998 to 2002, Zeman was the minister of Education, Youth and Sports.

References

1948 births
2017 deaths
Education ministers of the Czech Republic
Czech Social Democratic Party Government ministers
People from Most (city)
Members of the Chamber of Deputies of the Czech Republic (1992–1996)
Members of the Chamber of Deputies of the Czech Republic (1996–1998)
Members of the Chamber of Deputies of the Czech Republic (1998–2002)
Members of the Chamber of Deputies of the Czech Republic (2002–2006)